Phan Thiet Airport (Vietnamese: Sân bay Phan Thiết) is an under construction airport in Thiện Nghiệp, Phan Thiết, Bình Thuận Province, southern Vietnam. The mixed-use facility will cost around VND10 trillion (US$435.28 million) to build. The 543-hectare (1,341-acre) airport will be able to serve 500,000 passengers per year, according to the government website. It will consist of one 2,400-meter long runway and one 5,000-square-meter terminal.

History
By 2017, Binh Thuan People's Committee proposed to upgrade Phan Thiet 4C Airport to level 4E, runway from 2,400 m to 3,050 m in length to be able to exploit international flights in the future. One year later, the project approved by the Prime Minister is one of 15 domestic airports in the country with a 4E grade civilian airport combined with level 1 military airport.

On 5 April 2021, Phan Thiet airport project in Thien Nghiep commune resumed for construction by the Vietnam's Ministry of Defense, the project will be completed by the end of 2022. Phan Thiet Airport was approved by the Prime Minister in 2009, covering 543 hectares. It was started in early 2015 and expected to be completed in 2018, but then stopped.

References

Airports in Vietnam